Rajendra Chola I   (/rɑːdʒeɪndrə/; Middle Tamil: Rājēntira Cōḻaṉ; Classical Sanskrit: Rājēndradēva Cōla; Old Malay: Raja Suran;  c. 971 CE – 1044 CE), often referred to as Rajendra the Great, and also known as Gangaikonda Chola (Middle Tamil: Kaṅkaikoṇṭa Cōḻaṉ;  lit. 'Bringer of the Ganges'), and Kadaram Kondan (Middle Tamil: Kaṭāram koṇṭāṉ;  lit. 'Conqueror of Kedah ') was a Chola Emperor who reigned between 1014 and 1044 CE. He is considered the most significant ruler in early eleventh-century South Asia for his role in patronising the arts, encouraging trade and expanding the Chola Empire to its greatest extent.

Born in Thanjavur to Rajaraja I and his queen Vanavan Mahadevi, Rajendra assumed royal power as co-regent with his father in 1012 until the latter died in 1014, after which he ascended the Chola throne in his own right. During his reign, the Chola Empire was the largest and most significant political, military, and economic force in the Indian subcontinent. It extended its reach via trade and conquest across the Indian Ocean, making Rajendra one of only a handful of Indian monarchs who conquered territory beyond South Asia. His early years were marked by his involvement in the Chola Army, where he fought in several campaigns against the Western Chalukyas and the rulers of Anuradhapura, earning him his first victories. He also put down rebellions in the Chera and Pandiya vassal states and Sri Lanka. As Emperor, he completed the conquest of Anuradhapura and brought a large portion of Sri Lanka under imperial rule. Rajendra expanded Chola rule by defeating the kingdoms of Kalinga and Vengai and subduing the islands of Laccadives and the Maldives, which he renamed Munnir Palantivu Pannirayiram, meaning "Twelve Thousand Islands and the Ocean Where Three Waters Meet." These islands were later used as strategic naval bases. During his Southeast Asia campaign, he annexed Srivijaya, Kedah, Tambralinga and Pegu, achieving imperial dominance during his reign and cementing the Chola's continued influence in Southeast Asia.

Rajendra conducted an ongoing war of attrition against the Pala dynasty, resulting in him capturing a great deal of booty that he used to build the city of Gangaikondacholapuram, which would remain the capital of the Chola Empire and one of the great centres of trade and commerce in South Asia for several centuries. The city was remarkable for its magnificent artificial lake, extensive fortifications, moats surrounding the imperial palace, and the splendid Brihadisvara Temple. Rajendra was a devout man and a follower of Shaivism (a sect of Hinduism). However, he welcomed Buddhism and built several stupas across Southeast Asia and South India.

One of the most enduring legacies of Rajendra's reign was the emergence of new forms of trade. Thanks partly to his domination of the Strait of Malacca and several other coastal areas, a commercial system called "emporia" emerged, which refers to exporting goods according to their demand. This new system made trade within the Empire considerably more profitable, creating a cyclic effect where the highly lucrative trade networks engendered a larger and more powerful military, facilitating the further widening of those networks. In this, the Khmer Empire was a major ally and trading partner and helped the Cholas stretch their networks as far as Song China. This link allowed Rajendra to incorporate Chinese vessels into the Chola military. These massive networks also extended west, where the Cholas engaged in the spice trade with Arabia, North Africa, Anatolia, and Turkic.

Rajendra was succeeded by his son Rajadhiraja I, who ruled from 1044 to 1054.

Early life and ascension

The exact birth date of Rajendra I is still being determined. It is suspected that he was born around 971 CE. He was the son of Rajaraja I and queen Vanavan Mahadevi, aka Thiripuvāna Mādēviyār. He had a younger brother named Araiyan Rajarajan, a commanding general of a Chola army. (He must have had at least three sisters, the younger Kundavai, the queen of Chalukya-Vimaladitya, and a daughter called Mahadevi.) Other significant members of the royal household included queen mothers Dantisakti Vitanki alias Lokamahadevi and Kundavai, the elder sister of Rajaraja. The nakshatra of Rajendra's birth was Thiruvathirai (Ardra).

Rajendra was declared heir apparent and formally associated with his father in the administration of the Chola Empire in the final years of his rule (1012–1014).  In 1018, Rajendra (the Parakesari) appointed his son Rajadhiraja (the Rajakesari) as heir apparent or Co-Regent to the Chola throne (Ruled Pandya dynasty from 1018 to 1044).

Ruling career

Rajendra commenced his war expeditions in the Indian mainland when he was yet a co-regent of his father, with the capture of Aduthurai in central Tamil Nadu, Vanavasi of west Tamil Nadu, in one expedition in 1012. Then, he directed his attention to Kollipaakkai of north Andhra Pradesh and captured the same in 1013. Rajendra carried out these invasions on behalf of his father, Rajaraja I. In 1014 he led an expedition against the Irratiapaadi ElaraIiakam the north Karnataka and south Maharashtra. He also captured its capital city, the Mannaikadakkam the Maleked, on behalf of his father, which met this reverse after its initial capture by Rajaraja Cholan in 1006. With the death of Rajaraja Cholan I in 1014 CE and the ascension of Rajendra in the same year as the next emperor of the Chola empire, there was a lapse of two years in the latter, continuing with his war expeditions. In 1016 he first sent an expedition overseas to Sri Lanka and brought the entire Anuradhapura Kindom under his control. This was followed by an expedition to east Kerala in 1017 and captured the Kudamalai Nadu.

Rajendra's forces crossed the seas again in 1018 and captured the Pal Palanthivam, the many islands of Maldives and Lakshadweep. This was followed by the capture of Sandimaaththivu, the Kavaratti island overseas west of Kerala, also in 1018. In 1019, Rajendra sent another expedition against the Irrataipaadi Elaraiillakam the north Karnataka and south Maharashtra – now with its new capital at Kalyani, in the northmost Karnataka which the Cholas lost again but re-captured after a battle at Musangi of east Karnataka. Rajendra, with his capture of many regions in the Indian mainland after a lapse of two years, became more ambitious in conquering the northern and north-western parts of India. He commenced his war expedition in this direction in 1021 by capturing Sakkarakkoattam the south Chhattisgarh. From here, he split his forces into two and sent one in the order of the Ganges river in the north and the other in the north-western direction. At the same time, he stationed himself at Sakkarakkoattam until the two expeditions were complete.

The second expedition went towards river Ganges in the north from Sakkarakkoattam and captured the regions of Odda Vishayam of Odisha, Kosala Naadu the north Chhattisgarh, Thandabuththi in north Odisha, Thakkana Laadam in south Jharkhand, Vangala desam the Bangladesh, Uttara Laadam of north Jharkhand and reached the great river Ganges. The Chola Indian Mainland expedition ended in 1022, and details of the countries conquered by his forces in this single expedition were included in his Meikeerthi's from 1023. With the return of the Chola forces of Rajendra to the Chola capital, from their victorious expedition to Uttarapatha and Gangetic region countries in 1022, the Royal Guru of Rajendra, the Isaana Pandithar, built a temple at Kulampandel in Tamil Nadu named Gangaikonda Cholaeswarer temple. With his return, Rajendra claimed a new title, "Gangaikondaan", and gave the title "Gangaikonda Cholan" (the Chola who captured Gangai) to his younger brother, who led the Gangetic expedition. Rajendra commenced the construction of a new city named the "Gangaikonda Cholapuram", with a new Siva Temple named "Gangaikonda Cholaeswarem" and a big 'temple water tank' called the "Chola Gangam" where the holy water brought in from the Ganges River was mixed. The Essalam Copper Plates of Rajendra specifically state that with the conquest of the Gangetic region, Rajendra constructed the new city of the Gangaikonda Cholapuram, the great Gangaikonda Choleswarer temple, and the sacred Cholagangam Tank at the Udaiyar Palaiyam region of Ariyalur district. In this great temple "Gangaikonda Cholaeswarem" he built, the presiding deity of the Karuvarai (Sanctum Sanctorium) was known as the "Gangaikonda Cholaeswarer" also known as "Peruvudaiyar" - the God Siva in the form of Lingam, the biggest Lingam among the Siva Temples both in India and World over, having a height of 13 ft and 20 ft in circumference. The praśasti mentions Rajendra's Conquests:

The praśasti mentions Rajendra's Conquests:

The "Vijayamkonda Cholaeswarem" Siva temple – of Erumbur in the Cuddalore district (present Kadambavanesvara temple near Erumbur) was built to commemorate the victory of the forces of Rajendra over Sri Vijaya and many regions of Sumatra of Indonesia. The "Kadaremkonda Cholaeswarem" Siva temple – of Kudimallur in the Vellore district (present Bhimeswara temple near Kalavai) was built to commemorate the victory of the forces of Rajendra over Kadarem and many regions of Malaysia.

His far overseas war expedition commenced in 1023 with a large fleet of ships with Chola warriors directed first to Sri Vijaya, the Palembang of south Sumatra of Indonesia, which was captured. After that, they captured the Malaiyur of south Sumatra adjacent to Sri Vijaya.From there, the fleet crossed the seas and captured the Mevilibangham, the Bangha Island adjacent to south Sumatra. Then they moved to Pannai of east Sumatra in the mainland, followed by Ilamuridesam of north Sumatra. The forces now crossed to Malaysia and captured Vallaipandur of north-east Malaysia, followed by Kadarem of north-west and west Malaysia. From here, they went north and captured the Ilankasokam of south-east Thailand adjacent to Kadaram, followed by Mathamalingam of east Thailand and Thalaitakkolam of south-west Thailand. From here, the fleet went on sea homeward and, on their way, captured the Manakkavaarem in the Andaman and Nicobar Islands. They travelled by sea and captured the Magpapaalam, the seaport city of present south Myanmar, and returned to the Chola country. The Chola south-east Asian expedition ended in 1024, and details of the lands conquered by his forces in this single expedition were included in his Meikeerthan early silver kasu of Rajendra Ii's from the year 1025. With the victory of Rajendra over Sri Vijaya(m) of Sumatra, Indonesia, in 1023, he built a Siva Temple at Erumbur in Tamil Nadu and named it Vijayamkonda Cholaeswarem.

With his triumph over the Kadaram, Rajendra assumed another new title as "Kadaremkondaan", and one of his grandsons who led the Kadaram expedition was given the title "Kadaremkonda Cholan" (the Chola who captured Kadarem). A region of the present Kudimallur in Tamil Nadu was named the "Kadarekonda Cholapuram". Some villages in present-day Tamil Nadu still bear names as Kidarankondan at Thiruvaarur and Ariyalur regions (present Gedaramkondan in Ariyalur) and Kadaramkonda Cholapuram (present Narasingpuram). With the victories of Rajendra over Kadaram in Malaysia in 1023, he built a Siva Temple in north Tamil Nadu and named it Kadaremkonda Cholaeswarem.

It was with their triumphs in the wars in the Indian mainland and near overseas that they built the former two "magnificent & gigantic temples completely out of Granite stone" as living monuments of their great valour and superior status in this region, which are included in the present day UNESCO World Heritage Series. The latter two were built to commemorate their triumphs far overseas and as monuments of their outstanding achievements in South-East Asia and the superior status of the Medieval Chola Empire in the World History of that period (1025 CE).

Rajendra's Conquest Chronology

Battles in Southern India

Early campaigns
Rajendra led campaigns from 1002 CE. These include the conquest of the Rashtrakutas and the campaigns against the Western Chalukyas. He conquered the Chalukyan territories of Yedatore (a large part of the Raichur district between the Krishna and the Tungabhadra), Banavasi in the northwest of Mysore and the capital Manyakheta. Rajendra erected a Siva temple at Bhatkal. He also conquered Kollipakkai, located north of Hyderabad in present-day Telangana. An excerpt from an inscription in Tamil from Kolar states:

In 1018/19 CE, Rajendra marched into the Pandya and Chera Perumal kingdoms and conquered the two countries. Rajendra appointed one of his sons as viceroy with the title Jatavarman Sundara Chola-Pandya with Madurai as the headquarters (in charge of both Pandya and Chera/Kerala countries).

Chola–Chalukya wars 

Rajendra fought several battles with the Western Chalukyas. From 992 CE to 1008 CE, during the reign of Rajaraja I, Rajendra raided and annexed several towns, such as Rattepadi, Banavasi and Toanur.

In 1015 CE, Jayasimha II became the king of Western Chalukyas. He tried to recover the losses suffered by his predecessor Satyashraya, who fled his capital and was later restored to the throne by Raja Raja I as a tribute-paying subordinate. Initially, Jayasimha II was successful as Rajendra was busy with his campaigns in Sri Lanka In 1021 CE, after the demise of the Eastern Chalukyan king Vimaladitya of Vengi, Jayasimha supported the claim of Vijayaditya VII to the throne against the claims of Rajaraja Narendra. Rajaraja Narendra was the son of Vimaladitya and Chola princess Kundavai. Rajendra helped his nephew Rajaraja defeat Vijayaditya.

Rajendra fought Jayasimha in the battle of Maski. He led an army of 900,000 and defeated Jayasimha II at the Battle of Maski (1019 CE – 1020 CE). On the Eastern Front, Rajendra led Rajaraja Chola I's the army in Vengi and expelled the rulers in battle. Vengi was later the site of the coronation of Rajendra's nephew following his victories in the Chola expedition to North India.

Conquest of Anuradhapura

Conquest of Anuradhapura 
Under his father, Rajaraja I, Rajendra, Chola commander Vallavaraiyan Vandiyadevan commanded an army that invaded the island of Sri Lanka. The capital city of Anuradhapura was sacked by the Chola army.  The capital was at Polonnaruwa, which was renamed "Jananathamangalam", a title of Rajaraja. The Chola official Tali Kumaran erected a Shiva temple called Rajarajeshvara ("Lord of Rajaraja") in the town of Mahatittha (modern Mantota, Mannar), which was renamed Rajaraja-pura. Chola occupied territories in the island were named Mummudicholamandalam after Mummudi Chola or Rajaraja I, the father of Rajendra.

During his reign, Rajendra's father, Rajaraja I, annexed the Kingdom of Anuradhapura in northern Sri Lanka. Rajendra invaded the Kingdom of Polonnaruwa in the south in 1017 CE. Chola raids were launched southward from Rajarata into Rohana. By his fifth year, Rajendra claimed to have completely conquered the island. The whole of Anuradhapura, including the south-eastern province of Rohana, was incorporated into the Chola Empire. As per the Sinhalese chronicle Mahavamsa, the conquest of Anuradhapura was completed in the 36th year of the reign of the Sinhalese monarch Mahinda V, i.e. about 1017–18. But the south of the island, which lacked large and prosperous settlements to tempt long-term Chola occupation, was never really consolidated by the Chola. Thus, under Rajendra, Chola's predatory expansion in Ceylon began to reach a point of diminishing returns. According to the Culavamsa and Karandai plates, Rajendra led a large army into Anuradhapura and captured Mahinda's crown, queen, and daughter, a vast amount of wealth and the king himself whom he took as a prisoner to India, where he eventually died in exile in 1029.

Aftermath 
Eleven years after the conquest of Rohana, Prince Kassapa, son of Mahinda, hid in Rohana, where Chola forces vainly searched for him. Soon after the death of his father, Kassapa assumed the monarchy as Kassapa VI (also known as Vikramabahu) and "ruled" in Rohana for several years (c. 1029–1040) while attempting to organize a campaign of liberation and unification. Taking advantage of uprisings in the Pandya and Chera kingdoms, Kassapa VI massacred the Chola garrisons in Rohana and drove the 95,000-strong Chola army to Pulatthinagara. But he died before he could consolidate his power. A series of ephemeral aspirants to the throne subsequently appeared and disappeared in Rohana without dislodging the Cholas from the north. Kassapa VI's mysterious death in 1040, however, brought an end to the war. His successor Mahalana-Kitti (1040–1042), tried to lead an unsuccessful revolt against the Cholas.

Vijayabahu I (1055–1110) descended from or at least claimed to be descended from the Sinhalese royal house. He had defeated his most potent rivals in Rohana. He was anxious to take on the Cholas by the age of seventeen. The crisis in the country left a scattering of turbulent chiefs and intractable rebels whose allegiance, if any, was at best opportunistic, which proved a problem to both sides in the conflict, frustrating both the Sinhalese kings and the Cholas. Vijayabahu, from his base in Rohana, faced a similar difficulty; he had to contend with the hostility of local chiefs who regarded him as a more significant threat to their independence than the Cholas were.

For that reason, the Cholas occasionally recruited nominal support from rebel chiefs in Rohana. As a result, Vijayabahu needed help consolidating a firm territorial base from which to launch a decisive campaign against the Cholas. On the other hand, the Cholas needed to eliminate similar opposition to themselves in the north. Gradually the wider conflict developed into a prolonged, back-and-forth struggle of raids and counter-raids, with the forces of Vijayabahu advancing upon Polonnaruva and then falling back to fortresses in Dakkhinadesa and Rohana to withstand retaliatory Chola attacks and sieges.

Conquest of the Ganges

Conflict with the Palas 
 Chola expedition to the North India
In 1019 CE, Rajendra's forces marched through Kalinga towards the river Ganga. In Kalinga, the Chola forces defeated Indraratha, the ruler of the Somavamsi Dynasty. Rajendra took the help of the Paramaras and the Kalachuris, with whom Indraratha had a bitter enmity, and Rajendra took advantage of this situation. The combined armies defeated Indraprastha, and probably was killed. The Chola army eventually reached the Pala kingdom of Bengal, where they defeated Mahipala. The Chola army also defeated the last ruler of the Kamboja Pala dynasty, Dharmapala of Dandabhukti. The Chola army went on to raid East Bengal, defeated Govindachandra of the Chandra dynasty, and invaded the Bastar region.

The Tamil praśasti of Rajendra I reads:

Gangaikondacholapuram 
To celebrate his victory in the Ganges, Rajendra constructed a new capital at Gangaikondacholapuram and built the Gangaikonda Choleeswarar Temple, similar to the Brihadeeswarar Temple at Thanjavur. There has been general disagreement among historians on the nature of the expedition. Early scholars such as V. Venkayya interpreted Rajendra's campaign to "bring the waters of the Ganges into Chola territory" as a pilgrimage to the Ganges River. However, this theory has been refuted by later historians, the most notable being K. A. Nilakanta Sastri. That the campaign was military in nature is suggested by the last line of the Thiruvalangadu plates, which state that the king erected a Ganga-jalamayam jayasthambham or a "liquid pillar of victory" in the form of the Cholaganga tank.

The Chola expedition to the Ganges had a long-lasting influence. According to R. D. Banerji, a Kannadiga chief who accompanied Araiyan Rajarajan on his campaign settled in Bengal and founded the Sena Dynasty. It is believed that the Karnata people of Mithila, too, might have descended from soldiers in the Chola army. The Siddhantasaravali of Trilocana Sivacharya claims that many Saivite Brahmins from Bengal were taken to the Chola country, where Rajendra granted them lands. They eventually settled in Kanchipuram and the Cauvery Delta forming the Sivacharya community.

Southeast Asia Campaign

Invasion of Srivijaya 
Srivijaya was a kingdom centred on Palembang in Sumatra, ruled by the Sailendra dynasty. During the reign of Mara Vijayatungavarman, Srivijaya had cordial relations with the Chola Empire during the reign of Rajaraja Chola I; Mara Vijayatungavarman built a Chudamani Vihara at Nagapattinam. Sangrama Vijayatunggavarman succeeded Mara.

Khmer Emperor Suryavarman I made war on the kingdom of Tambralinga (in the Malay Peninsula). Suryavarman I requested aid from Rajendra. After learning of Suryavarman's alliance with Rajendra, Tambralinga requested aid from Srivijaya, which Sangrama granted. This eventually led to the Chola expedition against the Srivijiya Empire. This alliance had a religious nuance since the Chola Empire, and the Khmer Empire were Hindu Shivaists, while Tambralinga and Srivijaya were Mahayana Buddhists. King Suryavarman I of the Khmer Empire requested aid from Rajendra of the Chola dynasty against the Tambralinga kingdom. After learning of Suryavarman's alliance with Rajendra, the Tambralinga kingdom requested aid from the Srivijaya king Sangrama Vijayatungavarman. This eventually led to the Chola Empire coming into conflict with the Srivijaya Empire.

The Cholas are known to have benefitted from both piracy and foreign trade. Sometimes Chola seafaring led to outright plunder and conquest as far as Southeast Asia. While Srivijaya controlled two major naval choke points, Malacca and Sunda Strait, at that time was a powerful trading empire with formidable naval forces. Malacca strait's northwest opening was controlled from Kedah on the Peninsula side and from Pannai on the Sumatran side, while Malayu (Jamb).

Other Campaigns in Southeast Asia 
In 1025 CE, Rajendra led Chola forces across the Indian Ocean and invaded Srivijaya, attacking several places in Malaysia and Indonesia. The Chola sacked Kadaram (the capital) and Pannai in Sumatra and Malaiyur in the Malay Peninsula. Rajendra also invaded Tambralinga and the Gangga Nagara Kingdom in modern Malaysia and south Thailand. The Chola forces captured the last ruler of the Sailendra Dynasty, Sangrama Vijayatunggavarman. The Chola invasion was the end of Srivijaya. Srivijaya's maritime power declined under the Chola attack. After this, the Chola Empire conquered large portions of Srivijaya, including its ports of Ligor, Kedah, and Tumasik (now Singapore). The Chola invasion furthered the expansion of Tamil merchant associations such as the Manigramam, Ayyavole, and Ainnurruvar into Southeast Asia. For the next century, Tamil trading companies from southern India dominated Southeast Asia. The expedition of Rajendra is mentioned in the corrupted form as Raja Chulan in the medieval Malay chronicle Sejarah Melaya, and Malay princes have names ending with Cholan or Chulan, such as Raja Chulan of Perak. One record of Rajendra describes him as the King of Lamuri in north Sumatra. The Chola invasion led to the fall of the Sailendra Dynasty of Srivijaya, and the Chola invasion also coincided with the return voyage of the great Buddhist scholar Atiśa from Sumatra to India in 1025.

Despite the devastation, the Srivijaya mandala survived as the Chola invasion failed to install direct administration over Srivijaya since the attack was short and only meant to plunder. Nevertheless, this invasion gravely weakened the Srivijayan hegemony. It enabled the formation of regional kingdoms like Kahuripan and its successor, Kediri, in Java based on agriculture rather than coastal and long-distance trade. Sri Deva was enthroned as the new king, and trading activities resumed. He sent an embassy to the court of China in 1028 CE. Although the invasion was not followed by direct Cholan occupation, and the region was unchanged geographically, trade had considerable consequences. Tamil traders encroached on the Srivijayan realm, traditionally controlled by Malay traders, and the Tamil guilds' influence increased on the Malay Peninsula and north coast of Sumatra.

Aftermath 
With the growing presence of Tamil guilds in the region, relations improved between Srivijaya and the Cholas. Chola nobles were accepted in the Srivijaya court, and in 1067 CE, a Chola prince named Divakara or Devakala was sent as a Srivijayan ambassador to the Imperial Court of China. The prince, who was the nephew of Rajendra, was later enthroned in 1070 CE as Kulothunga Chola I. Later during the Kedah rebellion, Srivijaya asked the Cholas for help. In 1068 CE, Virarajendra Chola launched a naval raid to help Srivijaya reclaim Kedah. Virarajendra reinstated the Kedah king at the request of the Srivijayan Maharaja, and Kedah accepted the Srivijayan sovereignty.

Death 

Rajendra I died in 1044 AD in Brahmadesam, present-day Tiruvannamalai district in Tamil Nadu. This information is recorded in an inscription by his son, Rajadhiraja I, which states that Rajendra's queen Viramahadevi committed sati upon her husband's death. Her remains were interred in the same tomb at Brahmadesam. It adds that the queen's brother, Madhuranthaka Parakesari Velan, who was a general in Rajendra's army, constructed a watershed at the same place in memory of his sister.

Personal life and family

The Siddanta Saravali of Trilochana Sivacharya states that Rajendra was a poet who composed hymns to praise the god Shiva. A commentary on the same work says that Rajendra brought several Saivas from the banks of the river Ganges and settled them in Kanchi and the Chola country.

Titles 

 After his successful campaign for the Ganges river in north India, he got the title Gangaikonda Chola (The Chola who took the Ganges river). And after his successful Southeast Asian campaign, he got the title "Kadaram Kondan" (He who took Kedah in Malaysia).
 He inherited the title Mummudi Cholan (Chola with three crowns) from his father Mummudi, a title used by Tamil kings who ruled the three kingdoms of Cholas, Pandyas and Cheras. Rajendra assumed other titles to commemorate his conquests, such as Mudigonda Cholan and Irattapadikonda Cholan.
 Rajendra I bore the title Chalukya-Chudamani, that is, Crest Jewel of the Chalukyas.

Family 
Rajendra I had many queens, including Tribhuvana or Vanavan Mahadevi, Mukkokilan, Panchavan Mahadevi, Puteri Onangki, and Viramahadevi, the last of whom committed sati upon her husband's death (1044 AD). He had seven sons, namely Rajarajan, Rajadhiraja, Manukula Kesari, Sanga varman, Rajendra II, Rajamahendran and Virarajendra. Rajarajan was the eldest of the seven, but he died as a pre-teen. Manukula Kesari died in 1021 CE during the war with western Chalukyas. Arulmoli Nangaiyar Piranar and Ammangadevi (queen of Eastern Chalukya Rajaraja I and the mother of Kulottunga I) are the two known daughters of king Rajendra.

Issues

Work and legacy

Temples 

Rajendra had built several vital sites. Rajendra built Gangaikondacholapuram to commemorate his victory over the Pala Dynasty. The name means The town of the Ganga Bringer (water from Ganga) or who defeated (the kings near) Ganga. This contained an artificial lake filled with water from the Kolerun and the Vellar rivers. The city has two fortifications, one inner and the other outer. The outer was wider. The remains of the outer fortification can be seen as a mound running all around the palace.

Rajendra established Gangaikonda Cholapuram as his capital from the medieval Chola capital of Thanjavur, which would become the capital for the next 250 years. Rajendra, I built the entire money with several temples using plans and infrastructure recommended in Tamil Vastu and Agama sastra texts. These included a Dharma Sasta, Vishnu and other temples. However, all these were destroyed in the late 13th and 14th centuries except the Brihadishvara temple. The other Chola landmarks are evidenced by soil-covered mounds and excavated broken pillar stumps and brick walls found over an area of several kilometres from the surviving temple.

Rajendra states that Dehejia must have involved the same artisans used by his father and transferred them from Thanjavur. Most or all of the Chola kings from Rajendra I had their coronation at Gangaikonda Cholapuram. Archaeological excavations have revealed fort walls and palace remains a few kilometres from this temple.

Rajendra also built a royal palace of burnt brick. The ceilings were covered with flat tiles of small size, laid in several courses, in fine lime mortar. The pillars were probably made of polished wood, supported on granite bases; a few pillar bases have survived to this day. Iron nails and clamps have been recovered from this palace site. A tunnel links the palace and the temple's inner first prakaara (north).

Rajendra also expanded the He also developed the Koneswaram temple in Trincomalee. The temple to Bhadrakali is located further along the complex inland along Konesar Road, benefitted from Rajendra.  The Kali temple is mentioned in the book Birds of Prey (1997) by Wilbur Smith, set in the 1660s. The Thirukonasala Mahatyam, describing the origins of the world, Lanka and Koneswaram based on puranic legends, is now lost. The historical literature Mattakallappu Manmiyam (Batticaloa Manmiyam) chronicles the Tamil settlement in Batticaloa, following the Dakshina Kailasa Puranam and Dakshina Kailasa Manmiam in describing Koneswaram as one of the nine most important and sacred sites in the world for all Hindus.

Rajendra also expanded the Pathirakali Amman Temple in Trincomalee. It attracted many pilgrims during his reign.

Rajendra developed a highly efficient water management system from the village level upwards. The increase in royal patronage and also the number of devadana and bramadeya lands increased the role of the temples and village assemblies in the field. Committees like eri-variyam (tank committee) and totta-variam (garden committees) were active, as also the temples with their vast resources in land, men and money. There are too many water tanks during the Chola period to be listed here. But a few most outstanding may be briefly mentioned. Rajendra built a large tank named Cholagangam in his capital city Gangaikonda Cholapuram, and it was described as the liquid pillar of victory.

Rajendra developed a highly efficient water management system from the village level upwards. The increase in royal patronage and also the number of devadana and bramadeya lands increased the role of the temples and village assemblies in the field. Committees like eri-variyam (tank committee) and totta-variam (garden committees) were active, as also the temples with their vast resources in land, men and money. There are too many water tanks during the Chola period to be listed here. But a few most outstanding may be briefly mentioned. Rajendra built a vast tank named Cholagangam in his capital city Gangaikonda Cholapuram, and it was described as the liquid pillar of victory.

Ottakoothar's Vikrama Cholan Ula mentions Rajendra's conquests:

The Malay-language Hikayat Iskandar Zulkarnain was written about Alexander the Great as Dhul-Qarnayn, and from it, the ancestry of several southeast Asian royal families is traced to Iskandar Zulkarnain, through Rajendra (Raja Suran, Raja Chola) in the Malay Annals, such as the SumatranMinangkabau royalty.

Inscriptions 

Several inscriptions of Rajendra were found throughout his reign and conquests.

An inscription of the king from the Adhipuriswara temple in Chengalpattu district gives his natal star as Tiruvadarai. Donations were made to the temple to celebrate the king's birthday in Maargali.

Another inscription from the Umamahesvara temple in Konerirajapuram, Thanjavur district refers to the donations by Alvar Parantakan Kundavai-Pirattiyar during the third year of the king's reign.

Officials and feudatories 
Rajendra (the Parakesari) appointed his son Rajadhiraja (the Rajakesari) as heir apparent to the Chola throne in 1018 AD. Large military expeditions, like the Pandya and Chalukya wars, were carried out by Rajadhiraja. The prominent feudatories or officials of the time were, 
 Vallavaraiyar Vandyadevar
 Yadava Bhima "Uttama Chola" Miladudaiyar
 Gangaikonda Chola Miladudaiyar
 Dandanayakan Narakkan Krishnan Raman
 Marayan Arumoli "Uttama Chola" Brahmamarayan
 Talaigrama Indaladeva

Popular culture
India's merchant navy training ship TS Rajendra was named in his honour.
The state government of Maharashtra proposed to dedicate Rajendra's portrait to Mazgaon Docks
The video game Age of Empires II: Definitive Edition: Dynasties of India contains a five-chapter campaign titled Rajendra.

Literature 
Vengayin Maindhan by Akilan covers the life and achievements of Rajendra
Gangapuri Kavalan by Vembu Vikiraman in which Rajendra's the protagonist
Mannan Magal by Sandilyan set in the period of Rajendra
Gangai Konda Cholan by Balakumaran
Ulagam Vendra Cholan by Bharathika which covers the war history and lifetime achievements

Gallery

See also
 Chola Empire
 Chola Navy
 List of Indian monarchs
 History of South India
 List of Tamil monarchs

References

Bibliography

Further reading
 
 R. Hall, Kenneth (October 1975). Khmer Commercial Development and Foreign Contacts under Sūryavarman I, Journal of the Economic and Social History of the Orient 18 (3), pp. 318–336. Brill Publishers
 Śrīnidhiḥ: perspectives in Indian archaeology, art, and culture by K. R. Srinivasan, K. V. Raman

Rajendra I
Year of birth unknown
1040s deaths
11th-century Indian monarchs
Hindu monarchs
Indian military leaders
971 births